I'm the Fiddle Man is Papa John's fourth solo album and the first with Buddah Records.  The album was recorded after Papa John Creach left Jefferson Starship following the successful album, Red Octopus.  The supporting band on this album is known as Midnight Sun and had a similar lineup to Zulu on Playing My Fiddle for You.  This album featured fewer original compositions than the previous album.

Track listing

Side A
"I'm the Fiddle Man" (Kevin Moore, John Lewis Parker, Papa John Creach) – 4:02
"Stardust" (Mitchell Parish, Hoagy Carmichael) – 5:13
"Enjoy" (Arthur Freeman, Roberta Talmage, Joyce Robbins) – 2:35
"The Rocker" (John Lewis Parker, Creach) – 2:37
"Jim Dandy" (Gary St. Clair) – 4:08

Side B
"Joyce" (Arthur Freeman, Ed Martinez) – 4:50
"I Know Where I'm Goin'" (D. Gibbs) – 2:35
"Solitude" (Edgar DeLange, Irving Mills, Duke Ellington) – 3:33
"You Left Your Happiness" (Eddie Williams, Triune (Paula De Pores, Orena D. Fulmer and Ruth Stratchborneo)) – 3:05
"Fiddlin' Around" (Arthur Freeman, Ed Martinez) – 3:40

Personnel
Papa John Creach – electric violin, vocals
Mark Leon – drums, vocals
Kevin Moore – guitar, vocals
John Lewis Parker – keyboards, vocals
Holden Raphael – percussion, vocals
Bryan Tilford – bass, vocals
Arthur Freeman – arranger & conductor
Wiliam Kurasch – concertmaster
Ginger Blake, Maxine Willard Waters, Julia Tillman Waters – background vocals

Production
Ed Martinez – producer
Recorded at Golden West Sound Recorders, Hollywood, Calif.
Bruce Ablin – recording engineer, mixdown engineer
Mastered at Artisan Sound Recorders, Hollywood, Calif.
Bob MacLeod Jr. – mastering engineer
Sidney A. Sidenberg & Danny Kessler – management direction
Ed Caraeff – design & photography
Milton Sincoff – creative packaging direction

Papa John Creach albums
I'm the Fiddle Man
Buddah Records albums